is the first of two downloadable content expansion packs in the Pokémon Sword and Shield Expansion Pass for the 2019 role-playing video games Pokémon Sword and Shield on Nintendo Switch. It was developed by Game Freak and published by The Pokémon Company and Nintendo for the Nintendo Switch. It was released worldwide on June 17, 2020. It precedes The Crown Tundra (released on October 22, 2020). The Pokémon Sword and Shield Expansion Pass physical bundle pack was released on November 6, 2020.

The addition of Expansion Pass was used to replace the need for a third version or sequel of Sword and Shield. It is set on the coastal island, the Isle of Armor, based on the Isle of Man, which is off the coast of Sword and Shields fictional region of Galar. The player controls the protagonist during their journey through the island, home to the dojo of the former champion of the Galar region and his family. The Isle of Armors main gameplay consists of training the newly introduced legendary Pokémon named Kubfu. Completing the training will result in Kubfu evolving into one of two forms of the Pokémon Urshifu.

Gameplay

The island the expansion pack is set on is one inter-connected "Wild Area", a free-roaming open world with a free moving camera and dynamic weather, which has implications on which Pokémon species appear at a given time. Additionally, "Raid Dens" appear which are small arenas for battling and catching Dynamaxed and Gigantamaxed Pokémon. The game introduces trials, initiated by the island's dojo master and former Galar Champion, Mustard and also the once Master of Current/Former (depending on your progress in the main series) Champion, Leon, and must be completed to advance the story. The trials involving battling Pokémon and collecting items for "Max Soup", used for "Gigantamaxing" Pokémon. These trials grant the players access to Kubfu, a Pokémon that can be trained to be evolved into either a dark type or water type version of Urshifu. There is also the "Cram-o-Matic", a machine that resembles the Pokémon Cramorant. This machine combines items into creating new, and sometimes rare, items. A returning feature from the Pokémon Let's Go games is the player's leading Pokémon can follow them in the overworld. A new form of battling was introduced name "Restricted Sparring", which limits the types of Pokémon the player can bring to a battle. The expansion offers a big side quest involving the hunting of 151 Alolan Diglett, where the player would be awarded different Alolan Forms for certain milestones.

Pokémon
The expansion introduces the legendary Pokémon Kubfu and its evolution Urshifu. These Pokémon are central to expansion's plot and its themes of growth. Additionally, a regional form of Slowpoke and one of its evolutions, Slowbro have been added. The expansion also adds new Gigantamaxed forms for Venusaur, Blastoise, the region's starter Pokémon (Rillaboom, Cinderace, and Inteleon), and both forms of Urshifu. The expansion pass includes the Mythical Pokémon Zarude, which is a pivotal character in Pocket Monsters the Movie: Coco. The island contains 108 returning Pokémon that are not in the base game, though Game Freak had previously stated aversion to adding Pokémon past the release of the base game.

Plot
The player arrives at the island via a Flying Taxi connection from the Galarian mainland. Once at the island, the player meets up with a new rival, exclusive to the version of the game. They meet Avery if playing Pokémon Shield and Klara if playing Pokémon Sword. Due to a mix-up, the rival at the train station thinks the player is a new student and engages in a Pokémon Battle. The player is prompted to visit the "Master Dojo", where they meet Mustard, the dojo's master and former region champion, who challenges the player to a battle. Once the player has won the battle, Mustard declares that the dojo is at max capacity and initiates the "three trials", the winner of which will be given the "secret armor" of the Master Dojo.

The first trial is revealed to be chasing after and defeating three fast Slowpoke after they steal the rival's Dojo Uniform. After the player defeats all three Slowpoke alone, Mustard lets everyone who at least managed to catch up to the Slowpoke a pass to the second trial. The second trial involves finding "Max Mushrooms" for the dojo's secret recipe, the Max Soup, which allows certain Pokémon to Gigantamax. Upon finding Max Mushrooms, the rival challenges the player to a battle for the mushrooms. After beating the rival, the player can collect the mushrooms and return to the dojo, where they and their rival are revealed to be the only ones who were able to pass the trial. The last trial is a Dynamax battle between the player and the rival at the dojo's Battle Court. The player emerges victorious, granting the player the "secret armor" of the Master Dojo: the Legendary Pokémon Kubfu.

After the player has obtained Kubfu, Mustard tasks the player with raising its friendship. While the player can use standard friendship methods, Mustard recommends that the player take Kubfu to visit various spots around the island. During this time only, Master Dojo Students will be present at these different points across the island allowing the player and Kubfu a place to view and battle. Once the player and Kubfu become the best of friends, Mustard tells the player to choose one of the "Towers of Two Fists", the "Tower of Waters", or the "Tower of Darkness", and challenge it with Kubfu. Regardless of which tower the player chooses, Mustard will be waiting at the top floor, ready to challenge them with his own Kubfu. After defeating Mustard, the player can let Kubfu examine a special scroll that allows it to evolve into Urshifu. Depending on which tower the player chooses, the types and moves Urshifu obtains will be different.

If the player has already beaten the base game's main story, on their return to the dojo they will find that Hop, the rival character from the base games, came to the Isle of Armor to research about the Dynamax phenomenon. Mustard tells the player that Urshifu hates the taste of Max Soup, so, in order for it to unlock its Gigantamax potential, a special ingredient is needed to make it drink the Max Soup. The player and Hop are tasked with finding the special ingredient, and eventually Hop figures that it must be honey. He and the player travel to Honeycalm Island, where the player gets thrust into a Max Raid Battle against a Dynamax Vespiquen. After defeating it, the player will obtain a comb of Max Honey, which is the missing ingredient.

Upon the player's return to the dojo with the news of finding the key to unlocking Urshifu's Gigantamax potential, Mustard informs them that he wants to battle them in a no-holds-barred battle, where he uses his full power. In the battle, Mustard uses his own Gigantamax Urshifu, of the form opposite to the player's. After being defeated, Mustard declares that he has nothing more to teach them, ending the plotline.

A sidequest involves paying large amounts of watts - the special currency gained in the Wild Area, the Isle of Armor and the Crown Tundra - to Mustard's wife Honey. This unlocks dojo upgrades and other bonuses, including a fight against Honey herself. The player can request a battle with Mustard once per day, and the same also happens with either Klara or Avery. Once the player successfully maxes out the Master Dojo, there is a cutscene showing the player taking a stroll with Honey at the Fields of Honor, thanking the player for all the Watts invested to make the Master Dojo the facility it currently is. After that cutscene, she will give the player her rare League Card.

Development
The expansion pass was announced in the January 9, 2020 Pokémon Direct and again shown briefly in the March 26 Nintendo Direct Mini. Following this, the pass was shown in great detail in the June 17 Pokémon Presents, hours before The Isle of Armor was released.

Development for The Isle of Armor began shortly before Pokémon Sword and Shield was released. During interviews, it was mentioned that depending how far into the game the expansion pack would be entered, the levels of the Pokémon would be scaled accordingly. However, as is in the base game for wild Pokémon, levels instead scale with the number of Gym Badges the player has.

Reception

The Isle of Armor received "mixed or average reviews" according to review aggregator Metacritic. GameSpot considered it to be an extension on the best part of the base game being the Wild Area. The length of the expansion, specifically the story, was seen as too short; Álvaro Alonso of Hobby Consolas and Travis Northup of IGN wrote that the expansion's story only lasts a couple of hours and a lack of post-game does not help improve this problem.

One of the highlights according to critics was the giant Wild Area that is spread across the isles, with critics from TouchArcade calling it "the star of the show". Kallie Plagge of GameSpot noted that the expansion doubled down on the idea and made it "bigger and better" than the base game's version, making praises on the diverse scenery and better-suited game elements such as the dynamic weather system. In Alex Olney of Nintendo Life's review, he said that the Wild Area was well thought out and carefully planned, but did mark down the game due to "muddied graphics". He also praised the Pokémon scaling that was originally missing in the base game, such as with the up-scaling the size of Wailord.

Though fairly positive received, the expansion was mainly criticized for not doing much with its gameplay or story. Chris Carter of Destructoid mentioned that the game was solid and worth the price, but that the expansion did not fix the base game's problems nor did it shake up the "Pokémon formula". Other critics said the game didn't offer much. Sam Loveridge of GamesRadar+ concluded that the story and characters may not be enough to excite fans of the series and that the Wild Area was repetitive.

Notes

See also
Pokémon Sword and Shield: The Crown Tundra
Pokémon Sword and Shield

References

External links 

Video game expansion packs
Video games set on fictional islands
Video games set in the Isle of Man
Video game downloadable content